Hawarden is a small town in the Canterbury region of New Zealand's South Island.  It is located near Waikari, just off State Highway 7.

From 15 December 1884 until 15 January 1978, the town was served by the Waiau Branch, a branch line railway that at one stage was planned to become the Main North Line to Nelson and Blenheim. The Weka Pass Railway restoration project once had plans to retain the line through Hawarden, but later chose to terminate their line in Waikari. Some relics of the old railway line still remain at the site of Hawarden's railway station.

The town is home to the Flaxmere Gardens and is located in a scenic area near the Lake Sumner Forest Park, with a number of other lakes also in the vicinity.

Demographics
Hawarden is included in Upper Hurunui statistical area.

Hawarden had a population of 240 at the 2018 New Zealand census, an increase of 6 people (2.6%) since the 2013 census, and an increase of 39 people (19.4%) since the 2006 census. There were 108 households. There were 126 males and 114 females, giving a sex ratio of 1.11 males per female. The median age was 47.5 years (compared with 37.4 years nationally), with 48 people (20.0%) aged under 15 years, 27 (11.2%) aged 15 to 29, 99 (41.2%) aged 30 to 64, and 63 (26.2%) aged 65 or older.

Ethnicities were 93.8% European/Pākehā, 11.2% Māori, 2.5% Pacific peoples, and 2.5% Asian (totals add to more than 100% since people could identify with multiple ethnicities).

Although some people objected to giving their religion, 53.8% had no religion, 32.5% were Christian, 1.2% were Hindu, 1.2% were Buddhist and 2.5% had other religions.

Of those at least 15 years old, 24 (12.5%) people had a bachelor or higher degree, and 48 (25.0%) people had no formal qualifications. The median income was $24,900, compared with $31,800 nationally. The employment status of those at least 15 was that 84 (43.8%) people were employed full-time, and 27 (14.1%) were part-time.

Upper Hurunui statistical area

Upper Hurunui had a population of 1,473 at the 2018 New Zealand census, an increase of 48 people (3.4%) since the 2013 census, and an increase of 108 people (7.9%) since the 2006 census. There were 594 households. There were 747 males and 729 females, giving a sex ratio of 1.02 males per female. The median age was 45.2 years (compared with 37.4 years nationally), with 291 people (19.8%) aged under 15 years, 198 (13.4%) aged 15 to 29, 684 (46.4%) aged 30 to 64, and 300 (20.4%) aged 65 or older.

Ethnicities were 93.7% European/Pākehā, 6.9% Māori, 1.6% Pacific peoples, 2.2% Asian, and 1.6% other ethnicities (totals add to more than 100% since people could identify with multiple ethnicities).

The proportion of people born overseas was 13.8%, compared with 27.1% nationally.

Although some people objected to giving their religion, 49.7% had no religion, 39.5% were Christian, 0.2% were Hindu, 0.2% were Muslim, 0.4% were Buddhist and 1.4% had other religions.

Of those at least 15 years old, 150 (12.7%) people had a bachelor or higher degree, and 255 (21.6%) people had no formal qualifications. The median income was $28,300, compared with $31,800 nationally. The employment status of those at least 15 was that 594 (50.3%) people were employed full-time, 207 (17.5%) were part-time, and 24 (2.0%) were unemployed.

Education

Notable people
Sally Brooker, inorganic chemist
Joe Earl (born 1952), Olympic rower

References

Populated places in Canterbury, New Zealand
Hurunui District